Northwestern Ontario is a secondary region of Northern Ontario in the Canadian province of Ontario which lies north and west of Lake Superior and west of Hudson Bay and James Bay. It includes most of subarctic Ontario. Its western boundary is the Canadian province of Manitoba, which disputed Ontario's claim to the western part of the region. Ontario's right to Northwestern Ontario was determined by the Judicial Committee of the Privy Council in 1884 and confirmed by the Canada (Ontario Boundary) Act, 1889, of the Parliament of the United Kingdom. In 1912, the Parliament of Canada by the Ontario Boundaries Extension Act gave jurisdiction over the District of Patricia to Ontario, thereby extending the northern boundary of the province to Hudson Bay.

For some purposes, Northwestern Ontario and Northeastern Ontario are treated as separate regions, while for other purposes they are grouped together as Northern Ontario.

Geographic subdivisions
Northwestern Ontario consists of the districts of Kenora, Rainy River and Thunder Bay. Major communities in the region include Thunder Bay, Kenora, Dryden, Fort Frances, Sioux Lookout, Greenstone, Red Lake, Marathon, and Atikokan. There are also several dozen First Nations in Northwestern Ontario.

Time zones
Northwestern Ontario is divided between the Eastern Time Zone and the Central Time Zone.

Population

Northwestern Ontario is the province's most sparsely populated region: 54% of the region's entire population lives in the Thunder Bay census metropolitan area alone. Aside from Thunder Bay, Kenora is the only other municipality in the entire region with a population greater than 10,000.

The overall population of Northwestern Ontario has been in decline over the past decade, mainly because of a downturn in the forestry sector, but some individual municipalities within the region have seen modest population growth over the period.

Politics

Northwestern Ontarians tend to lean left politically, mainly due to the history and influence of labour unions and a growing environmental ethic. At the federal level, Northwestern Ontario is represented by Liberal MPs Marcus Powlowski in Thunder Bay—Rainy River and Patty Hajdu in Thunder Bay—Superior North, as well as Conservative MP Eric Melillo in the Kenora District,. Provincially, PC Greg Rickford represents Kenora—Rainy River, NDP Sol Mamakwa represents Kiiwetinoong, NDP Judith Monteith-Farrell represents Thunder Bay—Atikokan, and Liberal Michael Gravelle represents Thunder Bay—Superior North.

In 2005, some residents of the region expressed dissatisfaction at the level of attention paid to the region by the provincial government. Some, most notably former Kenora mayor Dave Canfield, and Fort Frances town councillor Tannis Drysdale, have proposed the idea of the region as a whole, or parts of it, seceding from Ontario to join Manitoba, although the campaign did not attract widespread public support.

See also

Northern Ontario
Northeastern Ontario

Notes

External links
Gateway to Northwestern Ontario History

Geography of Northern Ontario